The Berliet VXB-170 is a four-wheel armoured vehicle used primarily as an internal security vehicle. Developed and initially produced by Berliet until Berliet was merged with Saviem to form Renault Trucks (now Arquus), it lost to the Saviem VAB the competition to equip the French Army, even though it was cheaper than its competitor. Production stopped after fewer than 200 vehicles had been produced.

Its main user, the  French National Gendarmerie, calls it Véhicule blindé à roues de la Gendarmerie ("Gendarmerie wheeled armoured vehicle") or VBRG.

Design history
Designed in the late 1960s under a project maximizing the use of heavy truck components of the Berliet brand in combat vehicles, the VXB 170 (for 170 cv) entered production at the Berliet Bourg-en-Bresse plant.

It was selected in 1972 by the French Gendarmerie but it lost out to the Saviem VAB the competition for equipment of the French Army and, following the merger of Berliet and Saviem under the Renault brand in 1974, became redundant in the brand product offering so production was stopped soon after the Gendarmerie order was complete

Versions
There were originally three versions : 
 internal security (procured by the Gendarmerie in 4 versions : basic vehicle, command vehicle, blade vehicle, and winch vehicle);
 reconnaissance and patrol;
 light combat. 
The VXB was available with hydrojets but this option was never exercised.

Operators

Current operators
 - 155 VXBs were procured from 1974 for the mobile units of the French Gendarmerie, of which about 70 remain in service in continental France, Corsica and the French overseas territories (as of 2018). Called "VBRG" (Véhicule Blindé à Roues de la Gendarmerie, "Gendarmerie wheeled armoured vehicle"), it is usually equipped with a 7.62 mm (cal.30) AANF1 machine gun and a 56 mm ALSETEX Cougar grenade launcher. Some vehicles feature a bulldozer blade, others have a winch. They have been deployed by the Gendarmerie in Kosovo and Ivory Coast. They have been also used in both Overseas and Metropolitan France.
 - 12
 - 12
 - for peacekeeping operations

Former civilian operators
 - 10 (for police, now retired)

Former evaluation-only operators
 - 1 (considered for Ratel prototype)

Gallery

See also
Mohafiz-IV
Ratel IFV
SIBMAS
Véhicule de l'Avant Blindé
TM-170

References

External links
 Renault Trucks Defense
 French VBRG site

Berliet
Armoured personnel carriers of France
Wheeled amphibious armoured fighting vehicles
Internal security vehicles
Military vehicles introduced in the 1970s
Wheeled armoured personnel carriers
Armoured personnel carriers of the Cold War